Vince Barnett (July 4, 1902 – August 10, 1977) was an American film actor. He appeared on stage originally before appearing in more than 230 films between 1930 and 1975.

Early years
Barnett was born July 4, 1902, in Pittsburgh, Pennsylvania, the son of Luke Barnett, a well-known comedian who specialized in insulting and pulling practical jokes on his audiences. (Luke's professional nickname was "Old Man Ribber" and "the King of Ribbing".) 

Barnett graduated from Duquesne University Prep School and the Carnegie Institute of Technology. An avid amateur pilot since 1921, he flew mail planes during 1925-1926. Barnett appeared on Broadway in Earl Carroll's Vanities during 1927.

Practical jokes
A 1932 newspaper report noted that "Barnett for years [was] known in Hollywood as the 'professional ribber' -- appearing at banquets and parties as a paid 'insulter.'" He would insult the guests in a thick German accent, spill the soup, and drop the trays—all to the great delight of hosts who enjoyed watching their friends squirm and mutter "Who hired that jerk?" Wrote author Ephraim Katz, "Among the celebrated 'victims' of his practical jokes were President Franklin D. Roosevelt, Winston Churchill, George Bernard Shaw, Henry Ford, and Charles Lindbergh."

During the transition from silent films to sound, an employee at Metro-Goldwyn-Mayer hired Barnett to prank Louis B. Mayer. He impersonated a sound expert and went to a sound-stage under construction with Mayer, criticizing the construction and using double-talk to confuse him. He ended his evaluation by proclaiming the whole soundstage needed to be torn down, and Mayer was about to order it done before his co-workers revealed the prank. David Niven, in his 1975 memoir, recalled Barnett posing as an important German director at a testimonial banquet for Samuel Goldwyn. Barnett gave the guest of honor an uncomfortable time, announcing that Goldwyn hired actress Anna Sten only because he "wanted to get into her bloomers."

Film
Vince Barnett's initial involvement with Hollywood was as a screenwriter, "writing screenplays for the two-reeler movies of the late 1920s."

He began appearing in films in 1930, playing hundreds of comedy bits and supporting parts until retiring in 1975. Among his screen roles was the gangster "secretary" in Scarface. From 1930 Barnett appeared, usually as comedy relief, in films and on television in a career spanning 45 years. Among his early roles, apart from Scarface, were The Big Cage (1933), Thirty Day Princess (1934) and Princess O'Hara (1935). In later years, Barnett played straight character parts, often as careworn little men, undertakers, janitors, bartenders and drunks in pictures ranging from films noir (The Killers, 1946) to westerns (Springfield Rifle, 1952). He appeared in "B" comedies and mysteries: as gangsters in Petticoat Larceny (1943), Little Miss Broadway (1947), and Gas House Kids Go West (1947), and notably as Tom Conway's enthusiastic sidekick in The Falcon's Alibi (1946). After World War II, with the Hollywood studios making fewer films, Barnett became a familiar face on television.

Later years and death
In one of his last public appearances, Barnett showcased his unique brand of humor with a monologue, delivered at Madison Square Garden in the vaudeville revue The Big Show of 1936.

During the 1950s, Barnett had an eponymous restaurant in Santa Monica at 826 Wilshire Boulevard.

Barnett died of heart disease August 10, 1977, at Encino Hospital Medical Center. He was buried in Hollywood Forever Cemetery.

Selected filmography

 Wide Open (1930) - Dvorak
 All Quiet on the Western Front (1930) - Assistant Cook (uncredited)
 Night Work (1930) - Headwaiter (uncredited)
 Her Man (1930) - Waiter (uncredited)
 One Heavenly Night (1931) - Egon, Chauffeur (uncredited)
 Scandal Sheet (1931) - Barrett, Convict Reporter (uncredited)
 Side Show (1931) - The Great Santini (uncredited)
 Scratch-As-Catch-Can (1931, Short)
 Scarface (1932) - Angelo
 Horse Feathers (1932) - Speakeasy Patron (uncredited)
 The Night Mayor (1932) - Louis Mossbaum, Tailor
 Tiger Shark (1932) - Fishbone
 Heritage of the Desert (1932) - Windy
 Rackety Rax (1932) - 'Dutch'
 The Death Kiss (1932) - Officer Gulliver
 Flesh (1932) - Waiter
 Hallelujah, I'm a Bum (1933) - Assistant (uncredited)
 Fast Workers (1933) - Spike
 The Big Cage (1933) - Soupmeat
 Made on Broadway (1933) - Snitz Lepedis
 The Girl in 419 (1933) - Otto Hoffer
 Sunset Pass (1933) - Windy
 Tugboat Annie (1933) - Cab Driver (uncredited)
 Man of the Forest (1933) - Little
 The Prizefighter and the Lady (1933) - Bugsie
 The Ninth Guest (1934) - William Jones
 Madame Spy (1934) - Peter
 Registered Nurse (1934) - Jerry
 Thirty-Day Princess (1934) - Count Nicholaus
 Now I'll Tell (1934) - Peppo
 The Cat's-Paw (1934) - Wilks - a Gangster
 The Affairs of Cellini (1934) - Ascanio
 She Loves Me Not (1934) - Baldy Schultz
 Take the Stand (1934) - Tony
 Kansas City Princess (1934) - Quincy - Dynamite's Henchman
 Young and Beautiful (1934) - Sammy
 No Ransom (1934) - Bullet
 Crimson Romance (1934) - The Courier
 Hell in the Heavens (1934) - Ace McGurk
 The Secret Bride (1934) - Drunk in Diner
 Princess O'Hara (1935) - Fingers
 Black Fury (1935) - Kubanda
 Silk Hat Kid (1935) - Mr. Rabinowitz
 Don't Bet on Blondes (1935) - Chuck aka 'Brains'
 Champagne for Breakfast (1935) - Bennie
 Streamline Express (1935) - Mr. Jones
 I Live My Life (1935) - Clerk
 Riffraff (1936) - Lew
 Dancing Feet (1936) - Willoughby
 Captain Calamity (1936) - Burp
 Down to the Sea (1936) - Hector
 San Francisco (1936) - New Year's Eve Drunk (uncredited)
 I Cover Chinatown (1936) - Puss McGaffey - the Bus Driver
 Yellow Cargo (1936) - Speedy 'Bulbs' Callahan
 We're in the Legion Now! (1936) - Spike Conover
 After the Thin Man (1936) - Wrestling Manager at Party (uncredited)
 The Woman I Love (1937) - Mathieu
 A Star Is Born (1937) - Otto (uncredited)
 Bank Alarm (1937) - Clarence 'Bulb' Callahan
 Boots of Destiny (1937) - Acey Ducey - Sidekick
 The Singing Cowgirl (1938) - Kewpie
 The Headleys at Home (1938)  - Vince Bergson
 Sunset Murder Case (1938) - Barney
 Water Rustlers (1939) - Mike - the cook
 Ride 'em, Cowgirl (1939) - Dan Haggerty
 Exile Express (1939) - Deputy Constable
 Overland Mail (1939) - Porchy
 Heroes of the Saddle (1940) - Night Watchman
 East Side Kids (1940) - Whisper
 Boys of the City (1940) - Simp
 Stranger on the Third Floor (1940) - Cafe Customer (uncredited)
 Seven Sinners (1940) - Bartender
 A Girl, a Guy, and a Gob (1941) - Bystander with Packages (uncredited)
 Mr. District Attorney (1941) - Coroner's Messenger (uncredited)
 Paper Bullets (1941) - Scribbler, a Petty Forger
 Blondie in Society (1941) - Mr. Wade (uncredited)
 Puddin' Head (1941) - Otis Tarbell
 A Dangerous Game (1941) - Ephriam
 Jungle Man (1941) - Buckthorn - 'Buck' the Guide
 Sierra Sue (1941) - Shooting-Gallery Pitchman (uncredited)
 I Killed That Man (1941) - Drunk
 Blonde Comet (1941) - Curly
 Pardon My Stripes (1942) - Bartender (uncredited)
 Girls' Town (1942) - Dimitri
 Klondike Fury (1942) - Alaska
 The Corpse Vanishes (1942) - Sandy
 Gallant Lady (1942) - Baldy
 Stardust on the Sage (1942) - Sam Haskins
 My Favorite Spy (1942) - Kay's 2nd Taxi Driver (uncredited)
 The Phantom Plainsmen (1942) - Deputy (uncredited)
 Baby Face Morgan (1942) - Lefty Lewis
 Foreign Agent (1942) - Drunk
 Bowery at Midnight (1942) - Charley
 X Marks the Spot (1942) - George
 Queen of Broadway (1942) - Schultz
 Thundering Trails (1943) - Jailer (uncredited)
 The Crime Smasher (1943) - Henchman 'Gimp'
 Kid Dynamite (1943) - Klinkhammer
 High Explosive (1943) - Truck Driver (uncredited)
 Captive Wild Woman (1943) - Curley
 Petticoat Larceny (1943) - Stogie
 Danger! Women at Work (1943) - Benny
 Tornado (1943) - Albany Alvin (uncredited)
 Sweethearts of the U.S.A. (1944) - Clipper - 3rd Robber
 The Mask of Dimitrios (1944) - Card Game Kibitzer (uncredited)
 Leave It to the Irish (1944) - Barney Baker
 The Big Show-Off (1945) - Voice Teacher's Student (uncredited)
 High Powered (1945) - Worker at Dance
 Thrill of a Romance (1945) - Oscar
 River Gang (1945) - Organ Grinder
 Sensation Hunters (1945) - Agent
 The Falcon's Alibi (1946) - Goldie Locke
 The Virginian (1946) - Baldy
 Two Sisters from Boston (1946) - Singing Waiter (uncredited)
 Bowery Bombshell (1946) - Street Cleaner
 The Killers (1946) - Charleston
 No Leave, No Love (1946) - Ben
 Swell Guy (1946) - Sam Burns
 The Mighty McGurk (1947) - Tailor (uncredited)
 My Brother Talks to Horses (1947) - Schuyler (uncredited)
 I Cover Big Town (1947) - Louis Murkil
 Shoot to Kill (1947) - Charlie Gill
 Gas House Kids Go West (1947) - Steve
 Little Miss Broadway (1947) - Mack Truck
 The Trespasser (1947) - Bartender
 Brute Force (1947) - Muggsy - Convict in Kitchen
 Joe Palooka in the Knockout (1947) - Russell
 The Flame (1947) - Stage Door Attendant (uncredited)
 Big Town After Dark (1947) - Louie Snead
 High Wall (1947) - Henry Cronner
 Big Town Scandal (1948) - Louie Snead
 Thunder in the Pines (1948) - Bernard - Bartender
 Loaded Pistols (1948) - Sam Gardner
 Knock on Any Door (1949) - Carl Swanson - Bartender (uncredited)
 Big Jack (1949) - Tom Speed (uncredited)
 Deputy Marshall (1949) - Hotel Desk Clerk
 Mule Train (1950) - Joe - Barber
 Storm Over Wyoming (1950) - Telegraph Clerk (uncredited)
 The Second Woman (1950) - Giovanni Strobini (uncredited)
 Border Treasure (1950) - Pokey
 International Burlesque (1950)
 Hunt the Man Down (1950) - Joe (uncredited)
 Kentucky Jubilee (1951) - Mugsy
 I'll See You in My Dreams (1951) - Burlesk Comedian (uncredited)
 On Dangerous Ground (1951) - George (uncredited)
 Red Planet Mars (1952) - Seedy Man Listening to Radio (uncredited)
 Carson City (1952) - Henry
 Springfield Rifle (1952) - Cook (uncredited)
 The Jazz Singer (1952) - Bartender (uncredited)
 Charade (1953) - Berg
 Ring of Fear (1954) - Vendor (uncredited)
 The Human Jungle (1954) - Old Mugging Victim (uncredited)
 The Crooked Web (1955) - Ed, Stan's Partner in Drive-In (uncredited)
 The Quiet Gun (1957) - Undertaker
 Outlaw Queen (1957) - Gamler
 Monkey on My Back (1957) - Mushy - Barney's Trainer (uncredited)
 Girl on the Run (1958) - Janitor
 The Rookie (1959) - 1st Janitor
 Zebra in the Kitchen (1965) - Man in Manhole
 The Family Jewels (1965) - Oil Change Customer (uncredited)
 Dr. Goldfoot and the Bikini Machine (1965) - Janitor
 Green Acres, ‘An Old-Fashioned Christmas’ (1966, TV Series) - Gus
 Andy Griffith Show (1967–1968, TV Series) - Elmo
 The Spy in the Green Hat (1967) - 'Scissors'
 The Big Mouth (1967) - Man at Telephone Booth (uncredited)
 The Fastest Guitar Alive (1967) - Prescott Townsman (uncredited)
 Mayberry R.F.D. (1968–1970, TV Series) - Elmo
 Summer School Teachers (1974) - Principal Adams
 Crazy Mama (1975) - Homer
 Sixpack Annie (1975) - Bartender

References

External links

1902 births
1977 deaths
American male stage actors
American male film actors
Male actors from Pittsburgh
20th-century American male actors